The crack-dwelling ctenotus (Ctenotus rimacolus)  is a species of skink found in the Northern Territory and Western Australia.

References

rimacolus
Reptiles described in 1998
Taxa named by Paul Horner (herpetologist)
Taxa named by Alaric Fisher